Kandi Renae Wyatt (born 26 March 1991) is a Canadian professional boxer who has challenged for world championships in two weight classes; the WBO and WBA female light welterweight titles in 2019 and 2020, respectively; and the undisputed female welterweight title in December 2021.

Professional career
Wyatt made her professional debut on 5 December 2014, scoring a fourth-round technical knockout (TKO) victory against Christina Barry at the Shaw Conference Centre in Edmonton, Alberta, Canada.

After compiling a record of 8–0 (3 KOs), she faced Christina Linardatou for the vacant WBO female light welterweight title on 24 March 2019 in Athens, Greece. In what was the first world championship boxing match to be held in Greece, Wyatt was knocked down three times in the sixth round en route to the first defeat of her career, losing via sixth-round TKO.

After two more victories she faced Kali Reis for the vacant WBA female light welterweight title on 6 November 2020 at the Marriott Clearwater in St. Petersburg, Florida. In her second world championship attempt Wyatt suffered a ten-round unanimous decision (UD) loss, with the judges' scorecards reading 96–94, 97–93 and 97–92.

Following a UD defeat against Alma Ibarra in August 2021, Wyatt faced reigning champion Jessica McCaskill for the undisputed female welterweight title on 4 December at the MGM Grand Garden Arena in Paradise, Nevada. Wyatt suffered the third defeat of her career, losing via seventh-round TKO.

Professional boxing record

References

External links

Living people
1991 births
Canadian women boxers
Light-welterweight boxers
Welterweight boxers